The Faule Mette (German for Lazy Mette, alluding to the gun's rare deployment, difficult mobility, and limited loading and fire rate) or Faule Metze was a medieval large-calibre cannon of the city of Brunswick, Germany.

Cast by the gunfounder Henning Bussenschutte on the central market square Kohlmarkt in 1411, it was fitted with a conically tapered muzzle (calibre of 67–80 cm) which allowed the use of projectiles of varying size.

On 1 November 1717, the Faule Mette reportedly shot a  stone ball  The cast-bronze cannon was melted down in 1787 and recast to several lighter field guns, having fired only twelve times in its history.

Besides the Faule Mette, a number of 15th-century European superguns are known to have been employed primarily in siege warfare, including the wrought-iron Pumhart von Steyr, Dulle Griet and Mons Meg as well as the cast-bronze Faule Grete and Grose Bochse.


Footnotes

See also 
List of the largest cannon by caliber

References

External links 

Medieval artillery
Large-calibre artillery
History of Brunswick
Individual cannons